Damien Perquis (born 8 March 1986) is a French footballer who plays as a goalkeeper for Saint-Amand FC. He has formerly played professionally for Caen and Valenciennes.

He became first-choice goalkeeper in 2012, when he succeeded Alexis Thébaux in Caen.

In July 2020, after returning to Valenciennes FC from a loan spell at Dutch Eerste Divisie club TOP Oss, Perquis signed with lower league side Saint-Amand FC, who competed in the Régional 1 Ligue Hauts-de-France, one of the sixth tiers of the French football league system. He made the decision to move to the club after talking to Grégory Pujol who had also joined the club.

References

External links

1986 births
Living people
Sportspeople from Saint-Brieuc
French footballers
Ligue 2 players
Eerste Divisie players
Stade Malherbe Caen players
AS Beauvais Oise players
Valenciennes FC players
TOP Oss players
Association football goalkeepers
Footballers from Brittany
French expatriate footballers
French expatriate sportspeople in the Netherlands
Expatriate footballers in the Netherlands